Samuel Howard Bankhead (September 18, 1910 – July 24, 1976) was an American baseball player in the Negro leagues. He played from 1931 to 1951. He also played for the Dragones de Ciudad Trujillo along with Satchel Paige and Josh Gibson. In 1951, he became the first black coach in Minor League Baseball when he was a player-manager for the Farnham Pirates of the Provincial League. He played in several East-West all-star games from 1933 to 1946.

At age 26, Bankhead married Helen M. Hall on 25 February 1937 in Allegheny, Pennsylvania. He died in Allegheny in July 1976.

His brothers Joe, Fred, and Garnett all also played in the Negro leagues, and his brother Dan played Major League Baseball.

References

External links
 and Seamheads 

1910 births
1976 deaths
African-American baseball players
American expatriate baseball players in Mexico
Baseball players from Alabama
Birmingham Black Barons players
Farnham Pirates players
Homestead Grays players
Industriales de Monterrey players
Kansas City Monarchs players
Leopardos de Santa Clara players
Louisville Black Caps players
Mexican League baseball players
Minor league baseball managers
Nashville Elite Giants players
People from Sulligent, Alabama
Pittsburgh Crawfords players
Sabios de Vargas players
Baseball outfielders
20th-century African-American sportspeople
Baseball infielders